Čar is a village in the municipality of Bujanovac, Serbia. According to the 2002 census, the town has a population of 296 people. Of these, 295 (99,66 %) were ethnic Albanians, and 1 (0,33 %) other.

References

Populated places in Pčinja District
Albanian communities in Serbia